Srimara Srivallabha (r. c. 815–c. 862 AD) was a Pandya king of early medieval south India.

Srimara was famously known as the Parachakra Kolahala ("the Confounder of the Circle of his Enemies"). The Larger Sinnamanur Plates are the major source of information about this Pandya king. The Pallava version of the events related to this period can be found in the Bahur Plates of Nripatunga.

Life and career 
Srimara was born to Pandya king Parantaka Nedunchadaiyan (Varaguna I).

The Larger Sinnamanur Plates (Sanskrit portion) tells that Srimara defeated the "Mayapandya", the Kerala (Chera), the king of Simhala, the Pallava and the Vallabha. The Tamil portion claims victories at Kunnur and Vizhinjam as well as in Sri Lanka. It also describes his repulsion of an alliance of the Gangas, the Pallavas, the Cholas and others at Kudamukku (Kumbakonam).

Invasion of Sri Lanka 
The Pandya victories in Lanka are corroborated by the Mahavamsa.

Srimara invaded Sri Lanka during the reign of king Sena I of Anuradhapura
, ravaged northern countries and sacked the city of Anuradhapura. The king fled from his capital and took refuge in the Malaya country. Sena was eventually forced to make terms with the Pandyas (and the Tamil forces were withdrawn from Sri Lanka).

Struggle with the Pallavas 
Srimara was defeated at Tellaru (Wandiwash/Vanthavachi, North Arcot) by an alliance led by Pallava ruler Nandivarman III. The Pallava allies were the Gangas, the Cholas and the Rashtrakutas. The Pandyas retreated southwards into their home country (and the Pallava army even advanced as far the Vaigai). However, Srimara was able defeat the Pallava alliance in a battle near Kumabakonam (the Kudamaukku, c. 859 AD).

Srimarara was then defeated by the Pallava king Nripatunga in the battle of Arichil.

Rise of the Cholas 
Chola Vijayalaya captured the city of Tanjore some time before 850 AD. The flight with the Muttarayars of Tanjore, probably owing allegiance to the Pandyas at this time, meant weakening of the Pandya influence north the Kaveri River. This also strengthened the Pallava position in the region.

Late setbacks 
While the Pandya was concentrating his attention in the north against the Pallavas, the Sri Lankan king Sena II (successor of Sena I) attacked and sacked the city of Madurai. According to the Lankan sources, the invading king had allied himself with a rebel Pandya prince.

Army commanders of Sena II installed prince Varaguna II on the Pandya throne (Srimara Srivallabha is believed to have died in injuries sustained in battle).

Notes

References
 

Pandyan dynasty
Pandyan kings
9th-century Indian monarchs